The Glo Friends is an American television series that originally aired in 1986 as a segment of My Little Pony 'n Friends. Produced by Sunbow Productions and Marvel Productions in collaboration with Toei Animation, the 26 segments of Glo Friends played in rotation as a secondary series, alternating with MoonDreamers and Potato Head Kids. Glow Friends was later broadcast on the (CBN) Family Channel from 1989 to 1995 as part of the My Little Pony rebroadcast.

The television series was preceded by the Glo Friends toyline: small glow-in-the-dark toys in the shape of insects and other small creatures.  The toys were adapted from the original Glo Worm introduced in 1982 by the Playskool division of Hasbro. A line of books from Ladybird Books were published to accompany each Glo Friend.

Premise
The title protagonists in The Glo Friends were a community of small, glow-in-the-dark bugs that live in Glo Land, a magical kingdom located in the middle of a forest. Their homes are built near the Glo Pond, where the Friends harvest a substance known as Moondrops, which enables their ability to glow in the dark.

The peaceful existence of the Friends is constantly threatened by the Moligans, a group of mole-like creatures led by Starnose. The Moligans were banished from the kingdom of Moleslavia for various crimes including unlawful digging, robbery, and cheating. Since their banishment, the Moligans have been living underground and plotting revenge. The short-sighted Moligans endeavor to kidnap the Glo Friends in order to light the dark tunnels of their mining operations, and thereby extracting more gold.

Characters

Glo Friends
 Baby Glo Worm (voiced by Nancy Cartwright) - She is the youngest member of the Glo Friends community. She is seen spending most of her time along Glo Grannybug (see below). She is quite curious and often giggles. She also speaks, but only in short sentences. In the debut episode of the Glo Friends TV show Baby Glo Worm goes Bye-Bye, she escaped from her bed while the other Glo Friends were trying to sing a lullaby to make her sleep, and consequently got lost in the Moligans´ Tunnels, putting the other Glo Friends into trouble when they set off to find her.
 Garden Ant - He spends his time taking care of his plants and flowers. He cultivates vegetables for the Glo Friend community, and has a vast knowledge about them. He can't tolerate seeing the Moligans eating the roots of a tree, as seen in the episodes Forest Brigade (in which he protects his personal tree) and even in Easy Money Pt. 2 when a Moleslavian villager is selling "Root dogs" (like Hot Dogs with roots instead of sausages). He is a regular character in the TV series. His house is a sort of pumpkin located in Glo Land.
 Bunny Rabbit - A rabbit who is Garden Ant's best friend.
 Glo Bashfulbug - As her name indicates, Glo Bashfulbug is a female Glo Friend that doesn't know what to say in certain moments. Sometimes, she shows an attraction for Glo Worm, one of the bravest and smartest Glo Friends. In more than one moment, she said to Glo Worm that being brave is hard. She is a regular character in the TV series.
 Glo Bedbug - She is the laziest of the Glo Friends. The only things she usually wants to do is eating, singing, and sleeping. Sometimes, she plays.
 Glo Bonnie Beetle - She is another female Glo Friend. According to her description, she is very sweet. She doesn't appear in the TV series.
 Glo Bookbug -
 Glo Bopbug - He is an eight-legged Glo Friend that wears a top hat and shoes, and uses a cane. He is a regular character in the TV series. He likes to dance. In the Spanish dub of the show, he was called "Abuelete", literally translated as "Granddaddy"
 Glo Butterfly - She carries a magic wand. She believes that she can do magic tricks, although she actually can't. In the episode Make no mistake, it's magic, the other Glo Friends said that it is better not to tell her that her "magic tricks" are just coincidences, in order to keep her happy.
 Glo Bug (voiced by Charlie Adler) - He is sometimes considered the bravest of the Glo Friends. He is not afraid of danger. For example, in the first part of The Quest, he can't tolerate that Rook and the Red Ant army are destroying the forest and for that reason, without wasting time thinking, he dares to run into Rook and face him. For some reason, in the TV series and in his Playskool-Hasbro figure, his hat is pink, while in other media, such as the Ladybird books, his hat has multicoloured strips.
 Glo Cappy (voiced by Russi Taylor) - He loves going to explore the forests riding on Country Mouse and acts as a reporter of Glo Land. He informs the others about the dangers or anything worth to mention. He and his friend wear a blue cap.
 Country Mouse - A mouse who is Glo Cappy's best friend.
 Glo Clutterbug - He is a clumsy insect that usually messes up the situation, and puts the other Glo Friends into trouble. He often falls into traps.
 Glo Cricket -
 Glo Doodlebug (voiced by Will Ryan) - He loves art. He often gets frustrated when he feels that his artworks or his painting style are not appreciated. In the episode "The Masterpiece," Glo Doodlebug decides to leave Glo Land in order to go to a cave (accompanied by Snugbug) that he uses as a personal studio. He is a regular character in the TV series.
 Glo Firefly - He has a name that has double-meaning: his job is being a firefighter and he is a firefly. He doesn't appear in the TV series.
 Glo Flutterbug - His figure was only available through mail order as Glo Prayerbug. He doesn't appear in the TV series.
 Glo Grannybug - She is the wisest and oldest Glo Friend. She lives in the biggest treehouse of Glo Land. She often tells stories to the other Glo Friends and she is often seen taking care of Baby Glo Worm. She also loves celebrating parties with homemade food at the Full Moon Days, in which Moondrops falls to the Earth, as seen for examples in the episode "Beware the Tales of Gold."
 Glo Hopper - He is a green-bodied grasshopper who is usually seen riding on Glo Turtle. He tends to jump high under several circumstances, including surprise, happiness, etc.
 Glo Turtle - A turtle who is Glo Hopper's best friend.
 Glo Horsefly -
 Glo Nuttybug -
 Glo Prayerbug - She is a blue mantis-shaped Glo Friend that, as her name indicates, prays when something goes wrong. She appeared very few times in the TV show (only in the 10-part adventure The Quest and in The Glo Friends save Christmas special) and she had only very few lines. Her toy figure was only available in the US and Canada by mail order.
 Glo Scuttlebug (voiced by Mona Marshall) - He is a skypilot that rides on Dragonflyer. He is a regular character in the TV series.
 Dragonflyer - A dragonfly who is Glo Shuttlebug's best friend that acts as a plane.
 Glo Skunkbug - He is a stinking Glo Friend with purple nose (Most of the other Glo Friends have a red nose). He is a very close friend of Glo Clutterbug.
 Glo Sluggerbug (voiced by Frank Welker) - He wears a baseball cap and always carry a stick. He is very brave and in several moments he and his frog friend have excellent ideas when fighting against their enemies. He is a regular character in the TV series. The only moment in which he was seen playing a baseball match with the other Glo Friends was in the episode Bean Ball.
 Bullyfrog (voiced by Frank Welker) - A bullfrog who is Glo Sluggerbug's best friend.
 Glo Snail (voiced by Don Messick) -
 Glo Sniffles Snail - He has a constant cold. He doesn't appear in the TV series.
 Glo Snugbug - She is a pink caterpillar-shaped Glo Friend. She is not a regular character in the TV series. She only appeared during the 10-part episode The Quest and The Masterpiece, in which she seemed to show feelings for Glo Doodlebug. She tends to hug all his friends.
 Glo Spider -
 Glo Tootlebug -
 Glo Waterbug - Glo Waterbug is a sailor insect. He guards the Glo Moondrops Pond with Dipper Duck.
 Dipper Ducky (voiced by Charlie Adler) - A duck who is Glo Waterbug's best friend. He guards Glo Moondrops Pond with Dipper Duck.
 Glo Worm (voiced by Pat Fraley) - He is the original Glo Friend, and is the unofficial leader of the Glo Friends in the TV series. He is quite brave and smart. He wears purple pyjamas, although the original Glo Worm toy portrays him as wearing green pyjamas. This was a source of some controversy.

Glo Wees
A race of fairies that can glow like the Glo Friends. They are known to be nature's helpers:

 Dapple -
 Nippin -
 Nutcap (voiced by Hal Rayle) - A Glo Wee that carries around the Book of Nature which enables him to communicate with nature.
 Posey (voiced by Nancy Cartwright) -
 Spruce - A Glo Wee who is an expert juggler.
 Willow - A Glo Wee who conducts the symphony of nature.

Villains
 Moligans - The Moligans are the primary antagonists of the series. After being banished from Moleslavia for their crimes, they sought to start their mine and mine for gold in order to get enough to buy out Moleslavia. To accomplish this, they always try to target the Glo Friends to power their lanterns with no success.
 Starnose (voiced by Roger C. Carmel) - Starnose is the leader of the Moligans. He is physically tough and it is mentioned that he is able to scare anyone who tries to ignore his orders. In the Spanish dub of the Glo Friends TV Show, he was called "Narizotas", literally translated as "Big Nose".
 Nails (voiced by Susan Silo) - Nails is a selfish and egocentrical Moligan lady that only worries about her physical appearance or anything in her own benefit. She likes valuable and shining body complements (such as rings, necklaces, earrings, bracelets, etc.) and she doesn't tolerate that anyone calls her an "ugly witch" (or similar attributions). She seems to have an attraction to Starnose, and can often be seen clinging to him, but that may just be her trying to get close to the main power of the group. She also serves as the cook of the Moligans as seen in "Wizard of Rook."
 Old Moldy (voiced by Roger C. Carmel) - As his name indicates, Old Moldy is the oldest Moligan in the group. He needs to use a hammer-shape cane due to his old age and has seen a lot of things in his youth. Since he was young, his main dream was to melt a piece of gold to turn it in a huge river of gold. In the episode "Caverns of Mystery," his old mine was seen.
 Excavator (voiced by Charlie Adler) - Excavator is the second oldest Moligan in the group. He is a scientist that usually remains in his personal laboratory doing chemical experiments or inventing new mining artifacts such as the Bi-Pedal Turbo Tunneler (seen in two episodes of the TV show). In the Spanish dub of the TV series, he was called "Inventor".
 Brasher (voiced by Hal Rayle) - Brasher is a tall and intellectual Moligan. It is said that he has the best ideas about how to get the gold and the Glo Friends, but Starnose hears and takes them as they were of his own to consider himself as the "main brain of the Moligans".
 Smasher (voiced by Charlie Adler) - Smasher is Brasher's brother. Unlike Brasher, Smasher is (or acts as) stupid and dumb. Physically, he is tall and tough. He feels the need of "smashing" at least one Glo Friend (during the 10-part episode The Quest, he is seen several times trying to damage the Glo Friends in order to force them to work for the Moligans).
 Scoop (voiced by Nancy Cartwright) - Scoop is the youngest Moligan. She is also the only nice Moligan, often secretly sabotaging Starnose's plots, and is friends with the Glo Friends, but fears to leave the Moligans. She wears tight clothing and has a tall auburn hairdo and a braided ponytail.
 Tumbler - Tumbler is the shortest Moligan. He is also lazy, doing as little digging as possible, and is very gullible, often taking throwaway comments at face value.
 Rook (voiced by Hal Rayle) - Rook is a crow who used to work for Lord Driver of the Red Ant Army. After Driver left, the Moligans enlisted Rook as a spy and lookout. He has little love for his employers, once even dishing out the dirt on them to the Glo Friends newspaper.
 The Red Ant Army - They are a group of insects in a desert valley and Rook's former employers. They are led by Lord Driver (voiced by Frank Welker). They only appeared in "The Quest" in which they captured the Moligans and Glo Friends. It was because of them that the Moligans learned of the Glo Friends and their illumination abilities. Due to a breakout of the Moligans and the Glo Friends, Lord Driver and the Red Ant Army took flight when their kingdom ended up having a cave-in.
 Blanche (voiced by Sally Struthers) – The Wicked Witch of the North Pole. Dressed in purple fur, she appears on the Christmas special along with her live weasel furry scarf (voiced by Charlie Adler) and had an icicle wand. She trapped Santa Claus and his DearDeers (reindeer) in an ice cage in a plot to stop Christmas.

Episodes

Special
The 1985 television special The Glo Friends Save Christmas aired prior to the regular series. The plotline follows the Glo Friends rescuing Santa Claus and his reindeer from Blanche, the wicked witch of the north pole. With the help of a moose that had been rejected as one of Santa's reindeer, the Glo Friends save Santa Claus and defeat Blanche.

Cast
 Charlie Adler - Excavator, Glo Bug, Dipper Duck, Smasher
 Joey Camen - 
 Roger C. Carmel - Starnose, Old Moldy
 Nancy Cartwright - Scoop, Baby Glo Worm, Posey
 Townsend Coleman - 
 Pat Fraley - Glo Worm
 Katie Leigh - 
 Mona Marshall - Glo Scuttlebug
 Don Messick - Glo Snail
 Michael Mish - 
 Lorenzo Music - Moose (in "Glo Friend Save Christmas")
 Carroll O'Connor - Santa Claus (in "Glo Friends Save Christmas")
 Patti Parris -
 Hal Rayle - Rook, Brasher, Nutcap
 Will Ryan - Glo Doodlebug
 Susan Silo - Nails
 Sally Struthers - Blanche (in "Glo Friends Save Christmas")
 Russi Taylor - Glo Cappy
 Frank Welker - Glo Sluggerbug, Bully Frog, Lord Driver

Crew
 Alan Dinehart - Voice Director
 Stu Rosen - Voice Director ("The Glo Friends Save Christmas" only)

Alternate titles
 Bulgarian dub: Светулковците (Svetulkovtzite)
 Dutch dub: Twinkel Pinkel
 Finnish dub: "Keijukaiset ja mulikaanit"
 French dub: Les Luxioles
 German dub: Die Glimmerlinge
 Greek dub: Φωτεινούληδες (Fotinoulides)
 Hungarian dub: Ragyogiék; Villók
 Italian dub: Mille luci nel bosco / Gli amici dei sogni
 Polish version (English dub, Polish lector): Świetliki
 Spanish dub, in Spain: Los Gusiluz
 Swedish dub: Lyskompisarna och deras vänner
 Taiwan Mandarin Dub: 發光一族 (Fa Guang I Tzu)

References

External links

 
 
 
 Glo Friends book series

1986 American television series debuts
1987 American television series endings
American children's animated comedy television series
American children's animated fantasy television series
1980s American animated television series
The Family Channel (American TV network, founded 1990) original programming
Hasbro products
1980s toys
Television shows based on Hasbro toys
Toy animals
Television series by Sunbow Entertainment
Television series by Marvel Productions
Animated television series about insects
Television series by Claster Television
Toei Animation television